Arnold Frick (born 9 July 1966) is a retired male judoka from Liechtenstein, who competed for his native country at the 1988 Summer Olympics in Seoul, South Korea. There he was eliminated in the first round of the Men's Middleweight (– 86 kg) division by Senegal's veteran Akilong Diabone. Frick was one out of four judokas from Liechtenstein competing in South Korea; the other ones being Daniel Brunhart, Magnus Büchel, and Johannes Wohlwend.

References
sports-reference

1966 births
Living people
Liechtenstein male judoka
Judoka at the 1988 Summer Olympics
Olympic judoka of Liechtenstein